John Lawn (4 November 1840 – 29 July 1905) was a New Zealand goldminer and mine manager. He was born in Gwennap, Cornwall, England on 4 November 1840.

Logo: Te Ara - The Online Encyclopedia of New Zealand. Print all pages now. 
Lawn, John
by R. G. Lawn
Biography
John Lawn, the third child of Jenefer Webster and her husband, James Lawn, a miner, was born on 4 November 1840 in Gwennap, Cornwall, England. John, his seven brothers and three surviving sisters were raised in the small village of Lanner. His early education was meagre: he took his candle and penny in the evenings to attend the small local dame school. At an early age he spent time on the ore heaps around Lanner working as a 'pickey boy'.

In 1857, because of the decline of Cornish mining, three of the Lawn brothers – James, John and George, aged about 20, 16 and 14 – left home to seek their fortunes on the goldfields of Australia. A large family gathering bade the young men a tearful farewell as they left Lanner to embark from Falmouth. They reached Melbourne towards the end of the year.

John Lawn was quartz mining with a party of Cornishmen at Tarrangower, Victoria, when news came of the goldrush to Gabriels Gully, Otago, New Zealand, in 1861. He and his two brothers bought mining gear and a handcart in Melbourne and sailed for New Zealand. On the way the passengers lost faith in the captain, who did not have a navigation chart. Fearful of mishap, they mutinied, placing the captain below and the mate in command. The barque reached New Zealand, probably at Port Chalmers, in September 1861.

With their well-laden handcart, the brothers tramped about 54 miles to Gabriels Gully, along with many others heading for the field. As they trudged along, an old woman told them that they would never get their cart to the diggings; but they did. After experiencing bad weather, rough terrain and difficult river crossings, they arrived. The brothers saw a man and his wife working a claim; he shovelled the wash and she worked the cradle. They pegged their claim and a day after beginning work, using parts of the handcart as riffles, they recovered 14 ounces of gold. Their next claim, which was 48 feet square, was at Holy Joe's gully nearby. This also proved profitable. John Lawn and his brothers worked 5½ days a week: they collected firewood on Saturday afternoons and rested, according to their Christian beliefs, on Sundays.

The brothers sold little of their gold because the price on the field was low. After four months they returned to Dunedin, sold the handcart and boarded the City of Hobart for Melbourne. It is thought that they went back to quartz mining at Tarrangower, but in early 1865 they were back in New Zealand for the West Coast goldrush. They worked claims at Tucker Flat near Hokitika and at Maori Gully near Stillwater. John returned to Tarrangower during 1871; it appears that he went to South Australia soon afterwards to work in the copper mines around Moonta, Kadina and Wallaroo Bay – an area known as the Cornish triangle.

On 6 September 1873 John Lawn married Mary Elizabeth Coombe in St Mary's Church, Wallaroo. Their first child was born in 1874. Lawn soon crossed the Tasman again with his small family to live at Blacks Point, near Reefton, where there was a demand for hard-rock miners. He managed several mines in the Reefton field including the Just-in-Time near Capleston during 1882 and 1883. In 1885 he freeholded a small area of land on the lower end of Buller Road, built a house and settled there with his family. Lawn worked as a mine manager in Reefton until 1905; he was also inspector of nuisances for the Inangahua county.

John Lawn died at Reefton on 29 July 1905, having suffered a bad fall from a horse two days earlier. He was survived by seven daughters and three sons. His wife, Mary, had died in 1902. Lawn was mourned as an 'old and highly respected resident of Reefton' and as a 'kind and considerate father'.

References

1840 births
1905 deaths
New Zealand miners
People from Gwennap
English emigrants to New Zealand